Monléon-Magnoac is a commune in the Hautes-Pyrénées department in south-western France. It had 419 inhabitants in 2019.

See also
Communes of the Hautes-Pyrénées department

References

Communes of Hautes-Pyrénées